Death on the Set is a 1935 British mystery film directed by Leslie S. Hiscott and starring Henry Kendall, Eve Gray, Jeanne Stuart and Wally Patch. Its plot concerns a film director who murders a leading gangster and takes his place, later pinning the killing on a prominent actress. It is also known by the alternative title Murder on the Set.

The film was a quota quickie produced at Twickenham Studios by Julius Hagen for distribution by Universal Pictures.

Cast
 Henry Kendall as Cayley Morden / Charlie Marsh
 Eve Gray as Laura Cane
 Jeanne Stuart as Lady Blanche 
 Garry Marsh as Inspector Burford 
 Wally Patch as Sergeant Crowther 
 Lewis Shaw as Jimmy Frayle
 Alfred Wellesley as Studio Manager 
 Ben Welden as Freshman 
 Rita Halsam as Constance Lyon 
 Robert Nainby as Lord Umbridge 
 Hal Walters as Albert
 Elizabeth Arkell as Mrs. Hipkin

References

Bibliography
 Chibnall, Steve. Quota Quickies: The Birth of the British 'B' Film. British Film Institute, 2007.

External links

1935 films
1935 mystery films
British mystery films
1930s English-language films
Films directed by Leslie S. Hiscott
Films shot at Twickenham Film Studios
Films set in England
Films about filmmaking
British black-and-white films
1930s British films